The colonial governors of Florida governed Florida during its colonial period (before 1821). The first European known to arrive there was Juan Ponce de León in 1513, but the governorship did not begin until 1565, when Pedro Menéndez de Avilés founded St. Augustine and was declared Governor and Adelantado of Florida. This district was subordinated to the Viceroyalty of New Spain. In 1763, following the transfer of Florida to Britain, the territory was divided into West Florida and East Florida, with separate governors. This division was maintained when Spain resumed control of Florida in 1783, and continued as provincial divisions with the Spanish Constitution of 1812. The Spanish transferred control of Florida to the United States in 1821, and the organized, incorporated Florida Territory was established on March 30, 1822. This became the modern State of Florida on March 3, 1845.

First Spanish period, 1565–1763

British period, 1763–1784

East Florida

West Florida

Second Spanish period, 1784–1821

East Florida

West Florida

See also
 List of governors of Florida, for a list of United States territorial and state governors of Florida since 1821.

References

External links
 The Governors of Colonial Florida, 1565-1821 at University of West Florida

 

Florida
Florida

.
Florida
Florida governors